Various techniques in Object recognition and categorization
Automatic image annotation
Various techniques in text processing and natural language processing
Document classification
Part-of-speech tagging
Named entity recognition
Latent semantic indexing
Automated indexing
Automated music categorization

Automated semantic annotation, i.e. semantic tagging 

Object recognition and categorization